The Afghan tribal revolts of 1944–1947 or the Khost disturbances were a series of tribal revolts in the Kingdom of Afghanistan by Zadran, Safi and Mangal tribesmen which lasted from February 1944 to January 1947. The causes of the revolts laid in the worsening conditions of farmers, changes in conscription laws, the elimination of the power of Safi tribal leaders, Amanullah loyalism, trading monopolies, government surveillance, taxation, and poverty. The conflict began when government forces clashed with the forces of a tribal leader named Mazrak, who led the Zadran tribe in revolt. The Zadran uprising was followed by additional uprisings by the Safi and Mangal, the former of which elected their own king, Salemai. Faqir Ipi, a tribal leader from Waziristan (then part of British India), also fought for the restoration of former king Amanullah Khan alongside other rebels.

The Afghan government deployed Hawker Hind aircraft against the rebels, using aircraft to drop leaflets, gun down tribesmen and drop incendiary bombs. Mazrak invaded the British Raj in late 1944, though he was ultimately forced back into Afghanistan due to British aerial bombardment. Over the course of his uprising, Mazrak was joined by other rebel leaders, such as Sultan Ahmad and Abdurrahman (nicknamed "Pak"). Concurrently, Mohammed Daoud Khan fought against the Safi in the Eastern Province. The Mangal tribe rose up in June 1945. A 14-day long Safi siege of Kunar Khas was unsuccessful due to the Afghan air force supplying the settlement with food and ammunition. The Safi were defeated in late 1946, and Mazrak surrendered on 11 January 1947, ending the revolts.

Background 

According to Alexander Davydov, causes of the revolts lay in the worsening conditions of farmers. Farmers and landlords were required to forfeit one-third of their harvest to the government, a practice referred to as sekoti. They would then have to transport the harvests to government warehouses in Bar Kunar (Asmar) and Kuz Kanar (Khewa) districts. At the time, this could only be achieved with animal-powered transport. It was very commonplace for officials to delay acceptance of the deposit and question the quality of their produce. In order to be relieved from dues, farmers and landlords would often have to pay bribes. Despite this, the government of the Republic of Afghanistan (1973–1978) would, decades after the revolts, claim that the peasantry supported the Afghan government and that Safi tribes looted the peasant's homes and businesses in retaliation.

According to David B. Edwards, the causes behind the Safi revolt lay in the change in Safi conscription laws. For many years prior to the uprising, the accepted procedure for enlisting military recruits - known as the quami, or "tribal" method - had been for individual tribes to supply a certain number of men of their own choosing; these men would always serve together and generally in locations that were not far removed from their homes. Several years prior to the uprising, however, the government had insisted on employing a system referred to as nufus, or "population", in which the army conscripted its recruits directly from the population without consultation with any tribal body. The previous system was beneficial to the tribe, especially the tribal elders, who decided who would serve. The new procedure eliminated the power of Safi tribal leaders, and was thus fiercely resisted.

One of the rebel leaders, Mazrak, supported the restoration of Amanullah Khan, a king of Afghanistan who was deposed in the Afghan Civil War (1928–1929).

According to British records, the Safi uprising was caused by the Afghan government's attempts to institute conscription among the Safi, trading monopolies granted to Afghan merchant companies, and government surveillance. Whit Mason attributes the Safi uprising to "extremely brutal taxation, oppression and poverty".

Conflict

Operations in the Southern Province against Mazrak 

The operations which would be officially dubbed the Operations in the Southern Province against Mazrak began in February 1944. There are multiple accounts as to how this conflict began. According to British records, it began shortly after the Afghan government moved troops into the southern province to reassert their authority in the area, which by then was a safe haven for smugglers. En route, the government force was attacked by a Zadian tribal leader named Mazrak. According to a later Pakistani inquiry, the conflict began after the Afghan government raided Mazrak's summer homes at the Taragharai hills and his winter home at Almara, since Mazrak was suspected of housing Amanullah loyalist elements. For the following 3 months, Mazrak would carry out small raids from his new headquarters in Surkot. Government troops attempted to take Mount Almar in March 1944, but failed.

Mazrak was forced to retreat into the hills following an attack by the Afghan government on 22 April 1944. On 25 April, the Afghan government dispatched 6 Hawker Hind aircraft to Gardez to deal with the uprising, which returned on 21 June. During that operation, the Hind aircraft were focused on dropping leaflets and incendiary bombs. No large explosives were dropped, but there were several instances of hostile tribesmen being gunned down by the aircraft. 2-3 villages were said to have been destroyed by incendiary bombs during this time. On request of the Afghan government, the British Raj took precautions to prevent Waziri tribesmen from aiding Mazrak.

During the period of 1 August to 31 October 1944, no major Afghan aerial operations against Mazrak were undertaken, other than reconnaissance flights. Around this time, Mazrak was subject to heavy bombardment in British territory, where he was sheltered by local tribesmen, after which he retreated back to Afghan territory. During his brief stay in the British Raj, Mazrak was joined by Sultan Ahmed, a rebel chieftain from Balochistan. They were later joined by another rebel leader nicknamed Pak.

In November 1944, the appearance of a mysterious Malang who posed as the brother of Amanullah temporarily helped boost Mazrak's fortunes, but lack of money with which to bribe the tribes caused the failure of the movement, and Malang had disappeared into obscurity by March 1945. By this time, the situation of the Afghan government was the most critical since the Ghilzai rebellion of 1938 - their aerial capacity was limited by a shortage in bombs, their resources were stretched between the southern and eastern provinces, and the general population was discontented by high prices and a shortage of commodities. Further aerial operations against Mazrak, which included reconnaissance and bombing runs, took place in the Kunar valley from 24 June to 31 October 1945. Sultan Ahmad surrendered in November that same year, and was returned to Balochistan in custody. Despite Ahmad's surrender, Mazrak continued to fight. Ultimately, after 2 and a half years of resistance, Mazrak and his brother Sher Muhd Khan surrendered to the Afghan government, on 11 January 1947.

Safi uprising 
The Safi rose up in either 1944 or 1945. It started when an order to arrest the Safi leaders - Sultan Mohammad, Abdul Qadir, Mir Salam and Momoond Khan, came to the notice of Mir Salam who informed the other leaders and managed to incite a general uprising at Davagal and Badil among others. The conflict began when Safi rebels ambushed and captured government troops intended to gather conscripts. On 24 June 1945, 4 aircraft were dispatched to Jalalabad to deal with the Safi. Bombs and incendiaries caused extensive damage to Safi villages. One aircraft with 3 bombs, 1 vickers machine gun and 1 Lewis gun was lost during operations against the Safis. Among the villages bombed were the villages of Pacheyano Banda and Tanar. In one of the bombardments of the latter village, 11 members of a family were killed and the rest of the family members were unable to bury the dead in the village graveyard due to the threat of further bombardment. Instead they buried the dead in front of the family home, where they remained as of 2011. During this rebellion, it was rumoured among the Safi that the government intended to ship women off to Kabul to become prostitutes. Among the more enthusiastic rebel fighters were younger men with more to gain and less to lose from fighting the government. The Safi elected a monarch of their own, named Salemai, as well as a Prime Minister (Amanat Lewana) and a Minister of Defence (Amanul Mulk).

Some contemporary British records reported that the three Bādshāh Guls (i.e. grandsons of the Akhund of Swat) were active in support of the Kabul government while the Gul Şāḥib of Babra was secretly urging his followers in Chaharmung and Bajaur to support the Safis. However, further evidence of this has not been found.

The Afghan government armed Nuristani and Shinwari tribesmen to fight the Safi.

At one point in the rebellion, Safi rebels looted the government treasury in Chagha Serai. Starting in late August 1945, 1,500-2,000 Safi rebels besieged a 400-men strong government garrison at Kunar Khas. This siege lasted 14 days, with the Safi being unable to capture Kunar Khas due to the Afghan air force supplying the settlement with food and ammunition. Had the Safi been able to capture Kunar Khas, that may have resulted in the collapse of government control in the eastern province. By the end of October, most of the Safis, except for a few die-hards had come to terms with the Afghan government. This peace agreement included among other things the abandonment or postponement of Safi conscription. Aerial operations against the Safis in the Kunar valley ended in early November. In either 1945 or 1946, the Safi leaders, Shahswar, Said Muhd, Salim Khan and Allahdadd Khan fled to Mohmand tribal territory in the British Raj.

An oral account from 1983 described the revolt as follows:

On 23 November 1946, Mohammed Dauod Khan gave the remaining Safi peace terms, which included the return of rifles and small arms ammunition captured from government troops, the surrender of Shahswar, Said Muhd, Salim Khan and Allahdadd Khan, the sale of grain to the government at reasonable rates, and the despatch of Safi youths to Kabul for education. It is unclear if the Safi accepted these terms, but all sources agree that the Safi uprising had subsided by the end of 1946.

The events of this uprising are known as the Year of the Safi (Safi kal).

Duration 
The Safi uprising has received very little attention from scholars and researchers. Among the few texts that do discuss the revolt, there is disagreement about when it started and ended. The following table summarizes different information provided by various texts.

Mangal uprising 
The Mangal tribe rose up in Gardez in June 1945.

Role of aircraft 

Afghanistan had obtained Hawker Hind aircraft from Britain, purchasing 8 aircraft in 1937 and an additional 20 in 1939. During the tribal revolts of 1944–1947, these would come in use as the Afghan government used aircraft to drop leaflets, gun down tribesmen and drop incendiary bombs.

It was rumoured that on one occasion, Afghan aircraft accidentally bombed and machine gunned government troops or allied tribal levies, causing 40 casualties. There were also a few minor accidents at the Jalalabad airfield, but the aircraft did not incur serious damage. Two aerial officers, Muhd Anwar Khan (pilot) and Abdul Vaqil Khan (observer) were killed in the operations, while another aerial officer, a pilot, fell into the hands of the rebels in the Mazar or Pech Daras, where he was knifed in the back and had his throat cut, but survived after local villagers found him laying unconscious near his aircraft and tended to his wounds.

An incomplete list of aerial reconnaissance operations of note is listed below.

Leading figures

Afghan government 
 Mohammed Zahir Shah (15 October 1914 – 23 July 2007) was the king of Afghanistan during the revolts.
 Mohammed Daoud Khan (18 July 1909 – 28 April 1978) was commander of the central forces during the revolts. He led Afghan forces against the Safi.
 Mohammad Hashim Khan (1884 – 26 October 1953) was prime minister of Afghanistan during the revolts, until 9 May 1946.
 Shah Mahmud Khan (1890 – 27 December 1959) was prime minister of Afghanistan during the revolts, from 9 May 1946.

British Empire 
 Archibald Wavell (5 May 1883 – 24 May 1950) was Viceroy and Governor-General of India during this conflict.

Zadran tribe 
 Mazrak Khan Zadran ( 1900s – 1972) was the tribal chief of the Zadran tribe, which he led in revolt from February 1944 until his surrender on 11 January 1947.
 Sher Muhd Khan ( 1925 – 1947) was one Mazrak Zadran's brothers. He surrendered alongside Mazrak on 11 January 1947.
 Said Akbar Babrak (b. 1921 or 1922 – d. 16 October 1951) was another of Mazrak Zadran's brothers. He was a minor leader in this rebellion.
 Sultan Ahmad ( 1944 – 1945) was a Balochi chieftain who joined Mazrak. He surrendered in November 1945, and was returned to Balochistan in custody.
 Abdurrahman (nickname Pak,  1945) was a rebel leader who joined Mazrak. British records describe him as a "hardy perennial" and state that he had "inevitably" joined Mazrak.
 British records mention a "mysterious Malang" who posed as the brother of Amanullah and temporarily helped boost Mazrak's fortunes. A lack of money with which to bribe the tribes was stated to have caused the failure of the movement, and Malang had disappeared into obscurity by March 1945.

Safi tribe 
 Salemai ( 1940s) was the Safi king.
 Amanat Lewana ( 1940s) was the Safi prime minister.
 Amanul Mulk (died ) was the Safi minister of defence.
 Shahswar ( 1940s) was the Safi minister.
 Mir Azam Khan ( 1940s) was one of the leaders of the Safi revolt.
 Sultan Mohammad ( 1940s) was one of leaders of the revolt. According to the account of the University of Peshawar, he was one of the leaders who began the uprising after being informed of his impending arrest. However, according to David B Edwards, he was initially neutral and only joined after Mohammed Daoud Khan insulted him in a personal meeting. He was captured by Afghan forces and was sentenced to death, but Zahir Shah gave him clemency. David B Edwards dedicated significant parts of Before Taliban: Genealogies of the Afghan Jihad and Heroes of the Age: Moral Fault Lines on the Afghan Frontier to covering Sultan Mohammad's life, as well as those of his children.
 Abdul Qadir, Mir Salam and Momoond Khan ( 1940s) were, according to the account of the University of Peshawar, three rebel leaders who began the uprising after being informed of their impending arrest.
 Said Muhd, Salim Khan and Allahdadd Khan ( 1946) were three Safi rebel leaders who had fled to the British Raj by November 1946.

Mangal tribe 
 The leaders of the Mangal uprising are unknown.

Other rebel leaders, roles unclear 
 Faqir Ipi (Ghazi Mirzali Khan Wazir; 1897 – 16 April 1960) was a rebel leader who fought alongside the rebels.
 Ghilzai Malang ( 1945) was named by British records as an "outlaw" who was a threat to the Afghan government. It is unclear if he is related to the "mysterious Malang".
 Pak Malang ( 1945) was named by British records as an "outlaw" who was a threat to the Afghan government. It is unclear if he is related to Abdurrahman, who was nicknamed Pak.
 Abdur Rahim Khan (b. 1886), an ex-governor of Herat, was arrested in January 1946 for suspected complicity in the Safi revolt, together with his son-in-law, the Persian poet Khalilullah Khalili. He was released in 1948.

Aftermath 
With the defeat of the Safi and the surrender of Mazrak in late 1946 and January 1947 respectively, the revolts had come to a close. Hundreds of Safi were killed in the revolts, and following their defeat, the Kunar valley was ethnically cleansed of Safi Pashtuns. Other Safis, around 500 families, were exiled to Herat, Kabul or to Sholgara District.

Veterans of the Afghan army who fought against the Safi were awarded the Royal Medal for the Suppression of the Rebellion in Kunar Province. The silver medal bears an inscription and is dated ‘١٣٢٤’ (AH1324 = AD1945).

The tribal revolts of 1944–1947 influenced Afghanistan to take a pro-Pakistan stance during the Indo-Pakistani War of 1947–1948. A pro-India stance in this case would necessitate stopping Pashtuns from joining Pakistan's war against India, which was expected to cause a resurgence in rebel activity when the government was hoping to focus on national reform.

Some sources appear to state that a new conflict between the government and the Safi took place somewhere between 1947 and 1949. These include a mention of a "recrudescence in Safi discontent" in a British report dated 12 December 1947, which covered events from 1 May to 31 October 1947, although this report provides very little information in regards to the scope of the "recrudescence". The New Cambridge History of Islam also mentions a revolt among the Safi lasting from 1947 to 1949. An article by Hafeez R. Khan from 1960, titled "Afghanistan and Pakistan", also briefly mentions a Safi revolt lasting from 1948 to 1949 in a timeline of Afghan history. The Sovietization of Afghanistan also mentions a Safi revolt in December 1947, while placing its defeat as late as 1954. Transition in Afghanistan: Hope, Despair and the Limits of Statebuilding mentions "the putting-down of a Safi Pushtun revolt in 1947" as an aside. Besides the British document, none of these sources mention an earlier revolt in 1945 or 1946. The Cambridge History also states that the Safi were defeated by Mohammed Daoud Khan, implying that Daoud reprised his role in quelling the Safi in a new conflict from 1947 to 1949. However, Conflict in Afghanistan: A Historical Encyclopedia's biography of Daoud only mentions a single Safi revolt in 1945, which he quelled during his office as Commander of the Central Forces, which he held from 1939 to 1947. It should also be noted that it's very common for authors writing about the 1945 Safi revolt to give different start and end dates.

References

External links 
 Глава XXXVIII. Восстание Пуштунских Племен 1944–1945 ГГ. В Афганистане (Uprising of the Pashtun tribes 1944–1945, In Russian)

1944 in Afghanistan
1945 in Afghanistan
1946 in Afghanistan
1947 in Afghanistan
Conflicts in 1944
Conflicts in 1945
Conflicts in 1946
Conflicts in 1947
Military history of Afghanistan
Rebellions in Afghanistan